Lega Friuli-Venezia Giulia, whose complete name is , is a regionalist political party active in Friuli-Venezia Giulia. The party was a "national" section of Lega Nord (LN) from 1991 to 2000 and has been the regional section of Lega per Salvini Premier (LSP) in Friuli-Venezia Giulia since 2020.

The party is currently led by pro-tempore coordinator Marco Dreosto. Two of its former leaders, Massimiliano Fedriga and Pietro Fontanini, are President of Friuli-Venezia Giulia and Pietro Fontanini mayor of Udine, respectively.

History
The party was founded in 1990 as Lega Friuli by leading members of the Friuli Movement, including Roberto Visentin, Pietro Fontanini, Rinaldo Bosco, Sergio Cecotti and Alessandra Guerra. After that the Friuli Movement decided not join Lega Nord, they formed Lega Friuli in order to join. Visentin was the longstanding leader of the party until 1999.

LNF members were President or Vice President of the Region (1993–2003), President of the Province of Pordenone (1995–1999), President of the Province of Udine (1995–1999), mayor of Pordenone (1993–2001) and mayor of Udine (1998–2003). The party was the region's largest at the 1993 regional election (26.7%) and the 1996 general election (23.2%).

In 2001 Lega Nord Friuli was merged with Lega Nord Trieste to form a united regional section. At the time the party suffered many splits and a strong decline in term of votes, especially if compared to neighbouring Liga Veneta.

In the 2003 regional election Guerra was candidate for President of the House of Freedoms coalition. She was defeated by Riccardo Illy and the party gained only 9.3% of the vote. Between 2001 and 2007 Visentin, Bosco, Cecotti, Fontanini, Guerra, Giuseppe Zoppolato (national secretary from 2000 to 2003) and Marco Pottino (national secretary from 2005 to 2007) left or were ejected in party struggles. Guerra joined the Democratic Party in 2009.

In 2007 Fontanini was re-integrated in the party and in 2008 he was elected President of the Province of Udine and national secretary of the LNFVG. This represented a sort of return to normality for the party, which won 13.0% of the vote in the general election. At the 2009 European Parliament election the party won 17.5% of the vote, its best score in more than a decade. Moreover, from 2008 to 2013 the party was part of the regional government led by Renzo Tondo of The People of Freedom.

In 2012 Fontanini, who had never been able to lead a party divided in too many factions (notably including those led respectively by Claudio Violino and Enzo Bortolotti), stepped down from national secretary. Matteo Piasente was elected in his place with the support of 207 delegates out of 352 during a party congress. Fontanini, who grudgingly favoured Piasente, did not even take part to the congress, but nevertheless continued to be a leading member.

In the 2013 regional election the LNFVG obtained a mere 8.3% of the vote and just three regional councillors, due to Tondo's defeat. Soon after an expenses scandal, involving Regional Council floor leaders Danilo Narduzzi and Mara Piccin, emerged and the party looked increasingly divided among supporters of Piasente, including Violino and Narduzzi (who promptly resigned from deputy national secretary), Massimiliano Fedriga and Fontanini, who asked Piasente to resign. He actually stepped down in late June and was replaced by commissioner Gianpaolo Dozzo, who strove to maintain party unity.

In 2014, at a congress in Udine, Fedriga was unanimously elected national secretary, the first hailing from the Venetian-speaking Trieste in party's history.

In the 2018 regional election Fedriga was elected President with 57.1% of the vote and the party obtained 34.9% of the vote.

Popular support
In the 2018 regional election the party obtained its best result until that moment: 34.9% of the vote. The party's strongholds are Carnia (46.5%), which is part of the province of Udine (34.2%, without Carnia, which forms a separate constituency), and the province of Pordenone (36.7%).

The electoral results of Lega Nord in the region are shown in the tables below.

Electoral performance of the Lega Nord Friuli-Venezia Giulia at the regional elections.

Leadership
Secretary: Roberto Visentin (1990–1999), Edouard Ballaman (1999–2000), Giuseppe Zoppolato (2000–2003), Fulvio Follegot (2003–2005), Marco Pottino (2005–2007), Manuela Dal Lago (commissioner, 2007–2008), Pietro Fontanini (2008–2012), Matteo Piasente (2012–2013), Gianpaolo Dozzo (commissioner, 2013–2014), Massimiliano Fedriga (2014–2019), Vannia Gava (commissioner, 2019–2020), Marco Dreosto (commissioner, 2020–present)
President: Rinaldo Bosco (1991–2003), Alessandra Guerra (2005–2007), Enzo Bortolotti (2008–2012), Fulvio Follegot (2012–2015), Mario Pittoni (2016–2020)

References

1990 establishments in Italy
Federalist parties in Italy
Lega Nord
Political parties established in 1990
Political parties in Friuli-Venezia Giulia